The 2002 Munster Senior Hurling Championship Final (sponsored by Guinness) was a hurling match played on Sunday 30 June 2002 at Páirc Uí Chaoimh, Cork, County Cork,. It was contested by Waterford and Tipperary. Waterford claimed their first Munster Championship since 1963 and their sixth title in total, beating Tipperary on a scoreline of 2–23 to 3–12, an eight-point winning margin.

Waterford with Justin McCarthy in his first season as manager had defeated Cork in the semi-final by 1–16 to 1–15 to reach the final, while Tipperary the reigning All-Ireland Champions and managed by Nicky English had defeated Clare by 1–18 to 2–13 in the quarter final and Limerick by 1–20 to 1–13 in the semi-final to reach the final.
The match was screened live by RTÉ as part of The Sunday Game program.

Waterford's top scorers during the game were Paul Flynn and Ken McGrath, who scored one goal and 13 points between them. At half time Tipperary led by 1–10 to 1-09, but with a strong breeze in the second half in their favour Waterford went on to score 1–14 with Tony Browne scoring a second Waterford goal in the fifty third minute as Waterford scored 1-6 without reply in the final twenty minutes to secure an eight-point victory and their first Munster title in 39 years. The winning Waterford captain was Fergal Hartley who collected Munster Hurling Cup at the end of the match.

Match details

References

External links
 Highlights of the Match

Munster
Munster Senior Hurling Championship Finals
Tipperary GAA matches
Waterford GAA matches